József Nagy (born 28 June 1975) is a Hungarian professional boxer who competed from 2003 to 2014 with a record of 31–15. At middleweight, he won the IBF International and interim WBA Inter-Continental titles. At super middleweight, he held the IBF Inter-continental title and as a cruiserweight he won the WBF (Foundation) title. As an amateur, he competed in the men's welterweight event at the 1996 Summer Olympics.

References

External links
 

1975 births
Living people
Hungarian male boxers
Middleweight boxers
Super-middleweight boxers
Cruiserweight boxers
Olympic boxers of Hungary
Boxers at the 1996 Summer Olympics
Sportspeople from Debrecen